Chris Robinson (born September 28, 1967 in Edgewood, Maryland) is an American film director, commercial director, and music video director. He has directed films such as Netflix original Beats (2019). He has directed commercials for brands such as iPod, Coca-Cola and Verizon and music videos for songs like "Fallin'" and "You Don't Know My Name" by Alicia Keys, "Roc Boys" by Jay-Z, the Grammy nominated video for "One Mic" by Nas, and "Bonnie & Clyde '03" by Jay-Z featuring Beyoncé Knowles. Robinson made his debut as a music video director by helming the 1991 clip "Doo Doo Brown" by the group 2 Hyped Brothers & a Dog.

He is also known for the creation of the concept "Boost Mobile" ad campaigns featuring rap superstars, such as Kanye West, Ludacris, The Game, Eve, and others.

In 2006, he made his feature film directorial debut with coming-of-age drama ATL, starring T.I. and Big Boi.

Robinson is also a founding partner of RockCorps, an organization that encourages volunteerism in young people, which launched the Boost Mobile RockCorps program in 2005 and Orange RockCorps in 2008.

He was nominated for Video Director of the Year at the BET Awards of 2011 and in 2015.

Videography (by year)

 2 Hyped Brothers & a Dog - "Doo Doo Brown"
 50 Cent featuring Ne-Yo - "Baby by Me"
 Akon - "Sorry, Blame It on Me"
 Alicia Keys - "Fallin'" (2001)
 Alicia Keys - "Karma" (2004)
 Alicia Keys - "Superwoman" (2007)
 Alicia Keys - "Teenage Love Affair" (2007)
 Alicia Keys - "You Don't Know My Name" (2003)
 Alicia Keys featuring Maxwell - "Fire We Make" (2013)
 Amerie - "1 Thing" (co-directed with Amerie) (2005)
 Amerie featuring T.I. - "Touch"
 ASAP Rocky - "Wild for the Night"
 Bif Naked - "I Love Myself Today"
 Big Boi - "Shutterbugg"
 Big Pun - "100%"
 Big Pun featuring Donell Jones - "It's So Hard"
 Big Pun featuring Fat Joe - "Twinz (Deep Cover '98)"
 Boyz II Men - "The Color of Love"
 Brandy - "Full Moon" (2002)
 Brandy - "Long Distance"
 Brooke Valentine featuring Lil Jon and Big Boi - "Girlfight" (2006)
 Busta Rhymes featuring Mariah Carey and Flipmode Squad - "I Know What You Want" (2003)
 Busta Rhymes featuring Rick James - "In the Ghetto"
 Busta Rhymes featuring Sean Combs and Pharrell - "Pass the Courvoisier, Part II" (2003)
 Busta Rhymes featuring Lil Wayne and Jadakiss - "Respect My Conglomerate"
 Busta Rhymes featuring Linkin Park - "We Made It" (2008)
 Capone-N-Noreaga - "Y'all Don't Wanna"
 Cassie featuring Lil Wayne - "Official Girl" (2008)
Chris Brown featuring Drake - “No Guidance”
 Ciara featuring Young Jeezy - "Never Ever" (2009)
 Common featuring Lily Allen - "Drivin' Me Wild" (2007)
 Erykah Badu - "Honey" (under the pseudonym Mr. Roboto) (2008)
 Dave Navarro - "Hungry"
 DMX featuring Faith Evans - "I Miss You"
 DMX - "Lord Give Me a Sign"
 Dream featuring P. Diddy and Kain - "This Is Me (Remix)" (2001)
 Eminem featuring Lil Wayne - "No Love" (2010)
 Estelle featuring Rick Ross - "Break My Heart"
 Faith Evans - "Again"
 Faith Evans featuring Carl Thomas - "Can't Believe"
 Faith Evans - "You Gets No Love"
 Fat Joe featuring Lil Wayne - "Make It Rain"
 Fat Joe featuring Puff Daddy - "Don Cartagena"
 Fat Joe featuring Big Pun, Cuban Link & Triple Seis - "Bet Ya Man Can't (Triz)"
 Fefe Dobson - "Everything"
 Flo Rida featuring Nelly Furtado - "Jump"
 Frankie Cutlass - "The Cypher Part 3"
 Gilbere Forte - "Black Chukkas"
 Ginuwine - "None of Ur Friends Business"
 Ginuwine - "So Anxious"
 Ginuwine - "In Those Jeans"
 Glenn Lewis- Don’t You Forget It
 Gucci Mane featuring Swizz Beatz - "Gucci Time"
 J. Holiday - "Be with Me"
 Jadakiss - "Time's Up"
 Jay-Z - "Anything"
 Jay-Z - "Change Clothes"
 Jay-Z - "La-La-La (Excuse Me Miss Again)"
 Jay-Z - "Roc Boys (And the Winner Is)..."
 Jay-Z featuring Beyoncé - "'03 Bonnie & Clyde" (2002)
 Jamie Foxx featuring Drake - "Fall for Your Type"
 Jennifer Hudson - "Spotlight" (2007)
 Jennifer Hudson and Ne-Yo featuring Rick Ross - "Think Like a Man" (2012)
 Jill Scott - "Golden" (2004)
 JoJo - "Too Little Too Late" (2006)
 Jordin Sparks featuring Chris Brown - "No Air" (2007)
 Jordin Sparks - "S.O.S. (Let the Music Play)" (2009)
 Joss Stone - "You Had Me"
 Keri Hilson featuring Kanye West and Ne-Yo - "Knock You Down" (2009)
 Keyshia Cole and Monica - "Trust" (2009)
 LeToya Luckett - "She Don't"
 LeToya Luckett - "Torn"
 Lil' Mo featuring Fabolous - "Superwoman Pt. II" (2001)
 Lil' Mo - "Gangsta (Love 4 the Streets)"
 Lil Wayne - "How to Love" (2011)
 Lil Wayne - "On Fire"
 Lil Wayne featuring Eminem - "Drop the World"
 Lord Tariq and Peter Gunz - "Deja Vu (Uptown Baby)"
 Ludacris featuring Plies - "Nasty Girl"
 Ludacris featuring T-Pain - "One More Drink"
 Mary J. Blige featuring Eve - "Not Today"
 Mary J. Blige featuring Trey Songz - "We Got Hood Love"
 Mandy Moore - "Candy" (1999)
 Mario featuring Gucci Mane and Sean Garrett - "Break Up"
 Mario - "Thinkin' About You"
 Meeno - "I'm That"
 Mic Geronimo - "Nothin' Move But the Money"
 Monica - "A Dozen Roses (You Remind Me)"
 Monica - "All Eyez on Me"
 Monica - "Anything (To Find You)"
 Monica - "Knock Knock/Get It Off" (2003)
 Monica - "So Gone" (2003)
 Monica - "Everything to Me"
 Monica - "Love All Over Me"
 Musiq Soulchild - "Halfcrazy"
 Musiq Soulchild - "Girl Next Door"
 Musiq Soulchild - "Dontchange"
 Mýa featuring Jadakiss - "The Best of Me"
 Nas - "Daughters"
 Nas - "I Can" (2002)
 Nas featuring The Game and Chris Brown - "Make the World Go Round"
 Nas - "One Mic"
 Nate Dogg featuring Fabolous, Kurupt and B.R.E.T.T - "I Got Love (Remix)"
 Nelly - "'N' Dey Say"
 Nelly - "Wadsyaname"
 Nicki Minaj featuring Drake - "Moment 4 Life" (2011)
 Nivea - "Don't Mess with the Radio" (2003)
 Ne-Yo - "Miss Independent" (2008)
 P. Diddy featuring Black Rob and Mark Curry - "Bad Boy for Life" (2001)
 P. Diddy featuring Lenny Kravitz, Pharrell Williams & Loon - "Show Me Your Soul"
 R. Kelly featuring Keri Hilson - "Number One"
 Ras Kass featuring Dr. Dre and Mack 10 - "Ghetto Fabulous"
 Rick Ross featuring Usher - "Touch'N You"
 Santana featuring Sean Paul - "Cry Baby Cry"
 Shyne featuring Barrington Levy - "Bonnie & Shyne"
 Snoop Dogg featuring Pharrell Williams - "Beautiful" (2003)
 Swizz Beatz featuring Alicia Keys - "International Party"
 Tash featuring Raekwon - "Rap Life"
 Three 6 Mafia - "Hit 'Em"
 T.I. featuring Justin Timberlake - "Dead and Gone" (2009)
 T.I. - "I'm Serious" (2001)
 T.I. featuring Jamie Foxx - "Live in the Sky"
 T.I. - "What You Know"
 T.I. - "Why You Wanna" (2006)
 T.I. featuring Wyclef Jean - "You Know What It Is" (2006)
 Timbaland & Magoo featuring Fatman Scoop - "Drop"
 Tela - "Tired of Ballin'"
 The Beatnuts featuring Big Pun and Cuban Link - "Off the Books"
 Tweet - "Call Me" (2002)
 Tyga - "Rack City"
 Usher - "Confessions Part II" (2004)
 Usher and Alicia Keys - "My Boo" (2004)
 Usher - "Trading Places"
 Wale featuring Gucci Mane - "Pretty Girls"
 Wale featuring Lady Gaga - "Chillin" (2009)
 Wale - "Nike Boots"
 WC featuring Snoop Dogg and Nate Dogg - "The Streets"
 Young Jeezy featuring R. Kelly - "Go Getta"
 Young Jeezy featuring Keyshia Cole - "Dreamin"

Filmography

Film
 ATL (2006)
 Beats (2019)

Television
 Access Granted (2006)
 BET Honors (2009–16)
 Rip the Runway (2011–12)
 Real Husbands of Hollywood (2013–16)
 BET Presents Love & Happiness: An Obama Celebration (2016)
 Neighborhood Sessions: Usher (2016)
 Fusion's Snoop Dogg Roast Snoop Dogg Smokeout (2016)
 The New Edition Story (2017)
 Tiffany Haddish: She Ready! From The Hood to Hollywood (2017)
 Star (2017–19)
 The Climb (2017)
 BET Hip Hop Awards (2018)
 American Soul (2019)
 Wu-Tang: An American Saga (2019)
 Mixed-ish (2020)
 Grown-ish (2020–21)
 Black-ish (2020–21)

References

External links
 
 Chris Robinson at MVDbase.com
 Robot Films Production Company

African-American film directors
American film directors
American music video directors
Foothill College alumni
Living people
People from Edgewood, Maryland
1967 births
21st-century African-American people
20th-century African-American people